Francisco José Sota Bernard (born 30 October 1990), known as Fran Sota, is a Spanish professional footballer who plays as an attacking midfielder for Primera RFEF club Logroñés.

Club career 

He started his career at Osasuna and was a part of their reserves team in the 2009–10 season. Afterwards, he played for a number of football clubs in the lower divisions of the Spanish league system. He turned out for Pena Sport FC, CD Varea, SD Logrones, CD Tropezon, SD Leioa and Racing Ferrol before joining CD Calahorra ahead of the 2020–21 season.

On 25 January 2022, Sota joined Indian Super League club East Bengal on a short-term deal. He made his league debut on 2 February against Chennaiyin in their 2–2 draw.

Career statistics

Club

References

External links 

1990 births
Living people
Spanish footballers
Footballers from La Rioja (Spain)
Segunda División B players
Indian Super League players
CA Osasuna B players
SD Logroñés players
CD Tropezón players
SD Leioa players
CD Calahorra players
East Bengal Club players
Spanish expatriate footballers
Expatriate footballers in India
Spanish expatriate sportspeople in India
Association football midfielders